The 1981 Berlin Marathon was the 8th running of the annual marathon race held in Berlin, West Germany, held on 27 September. Great Britain's Ian Ray won the men's race in 2:15:42 hours, while the women's race was won by West Germany's Angelika Stephan in 2:47:24. Ray was the first non-West German winner of the race. A men's wheelchair race was held for the first time and was won by West German Georg Freund in 2:08:44. No women entered the wheelchair section. A total of 2567 runners finished the race, comprising 2418 men and 149 women.

Results

Men

Women

References 

 Results. Association of Road Racing Statisticians. Retrieved 2020-06-21.
 Berlin Marathon results archive. Berlin Marathon. Retrieved 2020-06-21.

External links 
 Official website

1981
Berlin Marathon
1980s in West Berlin
Berlin Marathon
Berlin Marathon